The Immaterial Murder Case is a 1945 mystery detective novel by British writer Julian Symons. His debut novel, it was the first in a trilogy featuring the Scotland Yard detective Chief Inspector Bland. The story gently makes fun of the "Great Detective" archetype popular during the Golden Age of Detective Fiction  Symons wrote the book in 1939 but didn't submit it for publication for several years during the Second World War.

Synopsis
In pre-war London wealthy American John Wilson associates with a group of avant-garde artists dedicated to a new movement dubbed "Immaterialism". When a body turns up in one of the artworks, Wilson calls in his cousin the amateur detective Teak Woode who proves to be rather incompetent when compared to the more measured Chief Inspector Bland.

References

Bibliography
 Knight, Stephen. Crime Fiction Since 1800: Detection, Death, Diversity. Macmillan, 2010.
 Walsdorf, John J. & Allen, Bonnie J. Julian Symons: A Bibliography. Oak Knoll Press, 1996.
 Woods, Tim. Who's Who of Twentieth Century Novelists. Routledge, 2008.

1945 British novels
Novels by Julian Symons
British detective novels
British crime novels
British mystery novels
Novels set in London
Victor Gollancz Ltd books